Qarğalıq (also, Qarğalıg and Kargalyk) is a village and municipality in the Masally Rayon of Azerbaijan.  It has a population of 1,516.

References 

Populated places in Masally District